Cheyenne County is a county located in the U.S. state of Colorado. The county population was 1,748 at 2020 census. The county seat is Cheyenne Wells.

History
Cheyenne County was created with its present borders by the Colorado State Legislature on March 25, 1889, out of portions of northeastern Bent County and southeastern Elbert County. It was named after the Cheyenne Indians who occupied eastern Colorado.

Geography

The drainage basins in Cheyenne County include Bellyache, Big Timber, East and Middle Fork Big Spring, Eureka, Goose, Ladder, Little Spring, Pass, Rock, Sand, Turtle, White Woman, Wild Horse and Willow Creeks, as well as the Smoky Hill River. The Smoky Hill drains into the Republican River in Kansas. The creeks in the northern and eastern part of the county drain to the Republican or Smoky Hill Rivers; those in the central and southeastern part of the county drain ultimately to the Arkansas River. All of the creeks in Cheyenne County are generally dry with some flow when drawing snowmelt or rainfall. There are four summits in Cheyenne County: Agate Mound (4,457 ft.), Eureka Hill (4,700 ft.), Landsman Hill (4,695 ft.), and Twin Buttes (4,621 ft.) The highest point in the county is in the extreme northwest corner of the county on the Bledsoe Ranch (5,255 ft.)

Adjacent counties
 Kit Carson County (north)
 Wallace County, Kansas (east)
 Greeley County, Kansas (southeast)
 Lincoln County (west)
 Kiowa County (south)

Major Highways
  U.S. Highway 40
  U.S. Highway 287
  U.S. Highway 385
  State Highway 59
  State Highway 94

Antipode
Cheyenne County is home of the Antipode of Île Saint-Paul making it one of the few places in the continental United States with a non-oceanic antipode.

Demographics

As of the census of 2000, there were 2,231 people, 880 households, and 602 families residing in the county.  The population density was 1 people per square mile (0/km2).  There were 1,105 housing units at an average density of 1 per square mile (0/km2).  The racial makeup of the county was 92.87% White, 0.49% Black or African American, 0.76% Native American, 0.13% Asian, 5.11% from other races, and 0.63% from two or more races.  8.11% of the population were Hispanic or Latino of any race.

There were 880 households, out of which 34.10% had children under the age of 18 living with them, 59.30% were married couples living together, 5.70% had a female householder with no husband present, and 31.50% were non-families. 29.00% of all households were made up of individuals, and 12.40% had someone living alone who was 65 years of age or older.  The average household size was 2.50 and the average family size was 3.12.

In the county, the population was spread out, with 28.80% under the age of 18, 7.10% from 18 to 24, 26.20% from 25 to 44, 21.30% from 45 to 64, and 16.60% who were 65 years of age or older.  The median age was 38 years. For every 100 females there were 100.60 males.  For every 100 females age 18 and over, there were 98.40 males.

The median income for a household in the county was $37,054, and the median income for a family was $44,394. Males had a median income of $32,250 versus $19,286 for females. The per capita income for the county was $17,850.  About 8.70% of families and 11.10% of the population were below the poverty line, including 12.90% of those under age 18 and 10.90% of those age 65 or over.

Communities

Towns
Cheyenne Wells
Kit Carson

Census Designated Place 

 Arapahoe

Unincorporated communities
Wild Horse

Politics

Since the 1920s, Cheyenne County has mostly supported Republican candidates in presidential elections. In the 25 presidential elections since 1920, the Democratic presidential candidates have carried the county only five times, none have broken 60% of the vote, and only Lyndon Johnson in 1964, and Franklin Delano Roosevelt in 1932 won the county by a double-digit margin. By contrast, the Republican nominees have carried the county 20 times, including the last ten in a row, with all except Wendell Willkie in 1940 winning by at least a double-digit margin. The four most recent GOP presidential candidates George W. Bush, John McCain, Mitt Romney, and Donald Trump all carried Cheyenne county with over 80% of the vote.

Historic Trails
 Old Military Trail - This trail connected Fort Wallace (on the Smoky Hill River in Kansas) to Fort Lyon (on the Arkansas River in Colorado).
 Omaha Trail - This trail came from Kansas into northeast Cheyenne County and merged with the Smoky Hill Trail east of Cheyenne Wells.
 Smoky Hill Trail - The Smoky Hill Trail is also called the Butterfield Trail and the Starvation Trail. It followed the Smoky Hill River, crossing Cheyenne County from east to west. Lt. John C. Fremont is known to have used this trail as early as 1844. When gold was discovered on Cherry Creek in 1859, the trail was promoted as the most direct route to Denver from the Nebraska and Kansas Territories. The route was treacherous and earned the name "Starvation Trail." David Butterfield established the Butterfield Overland Dispatch along this trail. The area was Indian hunting grounds. Several military forts were established along the trail to protect travelers. The Kansas Pacific Railway followed this trail through Kansas. The trail split near "Old Wells" (about five miles north of present-day Cheyenne Wells) into north and south forks. The north fork of the trail went northwest from "Old Wells" Station through Deering Wells Station, Big Springs Station, and David Wells Station and eventually to Denver. The south fork was first surveyed in 1860, and again in 1865. The south fork ran southwest from Old Wells through Eureka Station to Dubois Station. Then it headed northwest to Grady Station. The two forks joined up again near Hugo.
Texas-Montana Cattle Trail - This trail was used during the Civil War. It ran south to north across Cheyenne County through Big Springs Station.

Historic Sites
Cheyenne County Courthouse in Cheyenne Wells. The courthouse was built in 1908 and is listed on the National Register of Historic Places.
Old Cheyenne County Jail in Cheyenne Wells. The jail was built in 1894 and used as a jail until 1961. The structure is listed on the National Register of Historic Places.  The jail was designed by noted Colorado architect Robert Roeschlaub, who designed the Central City Opera House and other historic structures in Colorado. The Old Cheyenne County Jail is now a historical museum.
The Historic Plains Hotel in Cheyenne Wells. Built in 1919, the hotel is still used as a hotel.
Mountain States Telephone & Telegraph Building in Cheyenne Wells. The building's entablature frieze simply says "Telephone" in block letters. The building, constructed in 1927, is currently a museum.
Kit Carson Pool Hall in Kit Carson.
Union Pacific Pumphouse in Kit Carson. Built in about 1880, the stone pumphouse was used by Union Pacific Railroad's steam locomotives.
Wild Horse Mercantile in the town of Wild Horse. Built after the 1917 fire, the store was in continuous operation into the late 1960s.
Wild Horse School in the town of Wild Horse. The school was built in 1912.

See also

Outline of Colorado
Index of Colorado-related articles
National Register of Historic Places listings in Cheyenne County, Colorado

Notes

References

External links
Cheyenne County Government website
Colorado County Evolution by Don Stanwyck
Colorado Historical Society

 

 
1889 establishments in Colorado
Colorado counties
Colorado placenames of Native American origin
Eastern Plains
Populated places established in 1889